Denise Rudberg (born 19 June 1971) is a Swedish author in chick lit and later in detective fiction.

Rudberg studied drama in New York City in the 1990s and has previously also worked as a nightclub hostess at the Riche club in Stockholm. Rudberg and her friend author Camilla Läckberg hosted the literature series Läckberg & Rudberg on SVT.

In 2010, Rudberg changed her book genre from chick lit to the detective fiction genre which is set up in an upper-class environment. A style she herself refers to as "Elegant crime".

In popular culture
Rudberg was also a contestant on Let's Dance 2011 on TV4 where she was the first celebrity dancer to be eliminated.

Bibliography (in selection)
Väninnan (2000)
Storlek 37 (2002)
O.s.a. (2003)
Jenny S (2005)
Matilde (2006)Tillsammans (2007)Åse (2008)Tillsammans - andra boken (2008)Tillsammans - tredje boken (2009)Baristas (2010)Ett litet Snedsprång'' (2010)

References

External links
Denise Rudbergs blog

1971 births
Living people
Swedish-language writers
Swedish women writers
Swedish people of Estonian descent
Chick lit writers